Yapuchañani (Aymara yapuchaña to cultivate land, -ni a suffix to indicate ownership, "the one with cultivated land", also spelled Yapuchanani) is a mountain in the Cordillera Real in the Andes of Bolivia, about  high. It is located in the La Paz Department, Larecaja Province, Sorata Municipality. It lies northeast of Misk'i T'ant'a and Uma Jalanta, east of Janq'u Uma and Janq'u Piti and southeast of Wiluyu Janq'u Uma (or Wiluyu).

References 

Mountains of La Paz Department (Bolivia)